Yohanis Algaw (14 August 1999) is an Ethopian sprinter.

Honor and achievements

References 

1999 births
Living people
Ethiopian male sprinters
Athletes (track and field) at the 2019 African Games
Place of birth missing (living people)